René Badell (born 15 April 1948) is a Cuban gymnast. He competed in eight events at the 1972 Summer Olympics.

References

External links
 

1948 births
Living people
Cuban male artistic gymnasts
Olympic gymnasts of Cuba
Gymnasts at the 1972 Summer Olympics
Place of birth missing (living people)
Gymnasts at the 1971 Pan American Games
Pan American Games gold medalists for Cuba
Pan American Games medalists in gymnastics
Medalists at the 1971 Pan American Games
20th-century Cuban people